Counterblast is a 1948 British thriller film directed by Paul L. Stein and starring Robert Beatty, Mervyn Johns and Nova Pilbeam. It was made by British National Films at Elstree Studios.

Plot
A Nazi scientist escapes from prison, murders a leading professor and takes his place at a research laboratory, where he experiments with biological warfare with which he intends to wage the next war against Britain.

Cast
 Robert Beatty as Doctor Paul Rankin
 Mervyn Johns as Doctor Bruckner
 Nova Pilbeam as Tracy Hart
 Margaretta Scott as Sister Johnson
 Sybille Binder as Martha Lert, Bruckner's housekeeper
 Marie Lohr as Mrs Coles
 Karel Stepanek as Professor Inman
 Alan Wheatley as M.W. Kennedy
 Gladys Henson as Mrs Plum
 John Salew as Padre Latham
 Anthony Eustrel as Doctor Richard Forrester
 Carl Jaffe as Heinz
 Ronald Adam as Colonel Ingram
 Martin Miller as Van Hessian
 Aubrey Mallalieu as Major Walsh
 Olive Sloane as Ingram's Housekeeper

References

External links
 

1948 films
1940s English-language films
Films directed by Paul L. Stein
British thriller drama films
Films set in London
Films set in England
Films shot at British National Studios
Mad scientist films
British black-and-white films
1940s thriller drama films
Films with screenplays by Jack Whittingham
1948 drama films
1940s British films